Rafael de Souza Figueira or simply Pipoca (born January 6, 1990) is a Brazilian left back. He currently plays for Corinthians.

Also capped for Brazil at Under-17 level.

Contract
20 July 2006 to 19 July 2009

External links
 CBF
 SELEÇÃO BRASILEIRA DE FUTEBOL SUB-17

1990 births
Living people
Brazilian footballers
Sport Club Corinthians Paulista players
Association football defenders
People from São Bernardo do Campo
Footballers from São Paulo (state)